Osmitopsis parvifolia is a species of plant from South Africa.

Description 
The leaves are reflexed (bent downwards) and toothed. Flowers are present between September and February. The flower heads are radiate and solitary. They are yellow with white rays. The pappus (a modified calyx that surround the individual floret) is absent.

Distribution and habitat 
This species is endemic to the Western Cape of South Africa, where it grows between Betty's Bay and Sir Lowry's Pass. It grows on stony sandstone slopes and in crevices.

Conservation 
Although the species has no known threats, it has a small range. As such, it is considered to be rare by the South African National Biodiversity Institute.

References 

Anthemideae
Plants described in 1925
Flora of South Africa